Asomiya Khabar (Assamese: অসমীয়া খবৰ) (or Oxomiya Khobor) is an Assamese daily newspaper published simultaneously from Guwahati and Jorhat. It is one of the highest circulated Assamese daily newspaper. A weekly supplement named Deoboriya Khabar is published with it on every Sunday. It was placed as the second largest vernacular daily of the region. Biswajit Das is the executive editor of Asomiya Khabar.

See also
List of Assamese periodicals

References

External links 
  

Assamese-language newspapers
Mass media in Guwahati
2001 establishments in Assam
Publications established in 2001

as:অসমীয়া খবৰ